Rocky Island is an island in Lake Michigan. It is located in Fairbanks Township, in Delta County, Michigan.

Rocky Island was donated to The Nature Conservancy in 1986. In 2015, the island became part of the Green Bay National Wildlife Refuge.

Diagram

Notes

Islands of Delta County, Michigan
Islands of Lake Michigan in Michigan